Purley railway station is in the London Borough of Croydon on the Brighton Main Line,  measured from  ( from ), in Travelcard Zone 6. It is a junction, with branches to Caterham and Tattenham Corner.

History
Purley station has been known by three different names.

Godstone Road
The station was opened by the London & Brighton Railway on 12 July 1841 as Godstone Road.

Caterham Junction
In 1855 a proposal by a local company to connect the sandstone quarries at Caterham to the main line railway became embroiled in a long-running dispute between the LB&SCR and the rival South Eastern Railway (SER), which resulted in the reopening of the station as Caterham Junction. The proposed line was in the territory of the SER, and was to be operated by that company. It would have to join the railway system on a section of the LB&SCR, where the SER had running powers but no stations. The new railway had to sue the LB&SCR to force it to allow the junction with its line and to reopen the station. On 5 August 1856 the station reopened with the opening of the single track Caterham branch.

Purley
The SER built a line from Purley to Kingswood, extended to Tattenham Corner between 1897 and 1901. By the latter date it had become the South Eastern & Chatham Railway. The main station building facade reads 1899 as the year of construction.

Accidents and incidents
On 22 September 1873, John Cunliffe Pickersgill-Cunliffe, a former member of Parliament, was struck by a train at the then Caterham Junction station.  He died two weeks later at Guy's Hospital.

On 22 December 1894, a collision between a light engine and a passenger train injured six people.

The Purley station rail crash on 4 March 1989 occurred just to the north of the station, and left five dead and 94 injured. A memorial garden was created at the station to commemorate this.

On the night of 5 July 2002 a fire occurred on the 23:15 service from Caterham to London Bridge. A rail attendant, Philip Cable, helped put out the fire, and suffered an asthma attack and collapsed. He died at Mayday Hospital in Croydon a few hours later. A charge of manslaughter was laid against Karl Lacey, who was aged 16 at the time of the fire, and had set fire to newspapers and cushions in the carriage. After being found guilty, he was sentenced to four years' youth custody.

Platforms 

Platform 1 and 2 are normally used only on early mornings and when engineering works dictate. At all other times, services on the Brighton Main Line run limited stop between East Croydon and Brighton: these trains, together with Gatwick Express and Thameslink services, pass through platforms 1 and 2. During 2008 a fence was erected to prevent access to Platform 2, for safety reasons. Gates at both end of this fence are opened by staff for the few trains that stop.

Platform 4 is used for main line services to Horsham and Reigate, Thameslink services to Three Bridges and Sunday services to Bognor Regis.

Platform 5 and 6 serve the branch lines to Tattenham Corner and Caterham. Both these platforms can be used by trains in either direction, though platform 5 is primarily northbound towards London and platform 6 is usually southbound.

Services 
Services at Purley are operated by Southern and Thameslink.

The typical off-peak service in trains per hour is:

Southern
 2 tph to  via 
 2 tph to 
 2 tph to  

Southern services at Purley are operated using  EMUs.

Thameslink
 2 tph to  via 
 2 tph to Three Bridges via 

Thameslink also operate an hourly night service between Bedford and  although this service does not call at London Bridge.

Thameslink services at Purley are operated using  EMUs.

Connections
Several London Buses routes serve the station.

References

External links 

Railway stations in the London Borough of Croydon
Former London, Brighton and South Coast Railway stations
Railway stations in Great Britain opened in 1841
Railway stations in Great Britain closed in 1847
Railway stations in Great Britain opened in 1856
Railway stations served by Govia Thameslink Railway